Charles Granval (born Charles Louis Gribouval; December 21, 1882 – July 28, 1943) was a French stage and film actor. He was Jean-Pierre Granval's father.

Selected filmography
 Golgotha (1935)
 La belle équipe (1936)
 Sarati the Terrible (1937)
 The Terrible Lovers (1936)
 A Woman of No Importance (1937)
 Pépé le Moko (1937)
 The Man from Nowhere (1937)
 White Cargo (1937)
 The End of the Day (1939)
 First Ball (1941)
 La Nuit fantastique (1942)
 The Benefactor (1942)
 The Count of Monte Cristo (1943)

References

Bibliography
 Nicholas Macdonald. In Search of La Grande Illusion: A Critical Appreciation of Jean Renoir's Elusive Masterpiece. McFarland, 2013.

External links

1882 births
1943 deaths
French male film actors
French male silent film actors
20th-century French male actors
French male stage actors
Actors from Rouen